Étienne Gosse (Bordeaux, 1773 – Toulon, 21 February 1834) was an 18th–19th-century French playwright, chansonnier, and journalist.

Short biography 
In 1793 he volunteered in the army and quickly became an officer and secretary at the arsenal in Nantes. Wounded during the war in the Vendée in 1796, he retired from service.

A proponent of liberal ideas in le Miroir and la Pandore, his plays were presented on the most important Parisian stages of his time including the Théâtre de la Gaîté, the Théâtre Français, and the Théâtre des Variétés.

He died from a stroke of apoplexy in Toulon 21 February 1834.

Works 

1794: La Mort de Vincent Malignon, trait historique, in 1 act
1798: L'Épreuve par ressemblance, one-act comedy, in verse
1799: L'Auteur dans son ménage, one-act comedy, in prose, mingled with ariettes
1799: L'Épicière bel-esprit, one-act comedy, in prose, with François Bernard-Valville
1799: Les Femmes politiques, three-act comedy in verse
1799: Pygmalion à Saint-Maur, farce-anecdotique in 1 act and vaudevilles, with Bernard-Valville and Étienne Crétu
1800: Le Nouveau débarqué, one-act comedy, mingled with vaudevilles
1801: Pont-de-Veyle, ou le Bonnet de docteur, one-act vaudeville
1801: Quel est le plus ridicule ? ou La Gravure en action, one-act folie-vaudeville, with Crétu and Morel
1802: Les Amants vendéens, 4 vols.
1810: Couplets du Roman, music by Charles-Henri Plantade, arrangement for voice and piano by Narcisse Carbonel
1814: Récit de la captivité et de la délivrance de M. l'abbé Desmazure
1816: Le Médisant, three-act comedy
1818: Fables, 1818
1819: Proverbes dramatiques, 2 vols.
1820: Manon Lescaut ou Le Chevalier des Grieux, three-act melodrama
1820: Le Flatteur, five-act comedy in verse
1825: Cours de littérature dramatique ou Recueil par ordre de matières des feuilletons de Geoffroy, précédé d'une notice historique sur sa vie et ses ouvrages, 6 vols.
1827: Les Jésuites, ou les autres Tartuffes, five-act comedy in verse
1828–1829: Histoire des bêtes parlantes, depuis 89 jusqu'à 124, par un chien de berger, 2 vols.
1830: De l'Abolition des privilèges et de l'émancipation des théâtres, with François-Joseph Fétis
1831: Quatre millions à retrancher du budget de 1831
undated: Les Intrigants démasqués, ou le Souper de Forget aux Saintes-Claires, avec des notes instructives
undated: Les Émigrés à l'île d'Yeu, divertissement en un acte en vaudevilles et en prose

Bibliography 
 Émile Lefranc, Histoire élémentaire et critique de la littérature, 1841, (p. 328–329)
 François-Xavier de Feller, Biographie universelle, vol.8, 1844, (p. 343) (Read online) 
 Joseph-Marie Quérard, Charles Louandre, La littérature française contemporaine: XIXe siècle, 1852, (p. 130)
 Charles Dezobry, Théodore Bachelet, Dictionnaire général de biographie et d'histoire, 1866, (p. 1209)
 Pierre Larousse, Grand Larousse encyclopédique, vol.5, 1960, (p. 542)

References

External links 
 Étienne Gosse on Data.bnf.fr

19th-century French dramatists and playwrights
18th-century French dramatists and playwrights
French chansonniers
19th-century French journalists
French male journalists
French fabulists
1773 births
Writers from Bordeaux
1834 deaths
19th-century French male writers
18th-century French male writers